Bellevue High School may refer to:

Bellevue High School (Bellevue, Iowa)
Bellevue High School (Bellevue, Kentucky)
Bellevue High School (Bellevue, Michigan)
Bellevue High School (Bellevue, Ohio)
Bellevue High School (Texas)
Bellevue High School (Bellevue, Washington)
Bellevue East High School (Bellevue, Nebraska)
Bellevue West High School (Bellevue, Nebraska)
Bellevue High School (Nashville, Tennessee 1931-1980)